= Warfare system =

Definition

Warfare systems are tactical systems and tactical mission-support systems, such as weapons, sensors, command and control, navigation, aviation support systems, mission planning, intelligence, surveillance and reconnaissance, interior and exterior communications, topside design, and warfare system networks. Warfare systems may be found on naval vessels, military aircraft and other military hardware.
